The 1916 United States presidential election in Oregon took place on November 7, 1916 as part of the 1916 United States presidential election in which all contemporary forty-eight states participated. Voters chose five electors, or representatives to the Electoral College, who voted for president and vice president.

Background and vote
Oregon had been in the 1900s solidified as a one-party Republican bastion, which it would remain at a Presidential level apart from the 1910s GOP split until Franklin D. Roosevelt rose to power in 1932, and apart from a very short New Deal interlude at state level until the "Revolution of 1954". As of 1916, the state had not elected a Democratic Congressman since 1878, and between 1900 and 1954 Democratic representation in the Oregon legislature would never exceed fifteen percent except during the above-mentioned 1930s interlude, so that Republican primaries would become the chief mode of competition.

In 1912, a split in the Republican Party and the relatively limited appeal of Theodore Roosevelt’s Progressive Party in what was at the time the most Republican of the Pacific States allowed Woodrow Wilson to become only the second Democratic Presidential candidate after Horatio Seymour in 1868 to carry Oregon.

For his 1916 re-election against a United GOP, Wilson campaigned on keeping the United States out of World War I, and upon Progressive Era reforms like the income tax. These reforms were much less popular in Yankee-settled Western Oregon – which had close cultural and political ties to New England – with the result that Oregon voted for the Republican nominee, Supreme Court Justice Charles Evans Hughes of New York, over the Democratic nominee, incumbent President Woodrow Wilson of New Jersey. Hughes won Oregon by a close margin of 2.57%; however, alongside South Dakota, Oregon was the only state that Hughes won in the Great Plains or westward. Wilson’s historically based strength in sparsely populated and Ozark mountaineer-settled Eastern Oregon, like that of William Jennings Bryan in 1896, was inadequate to counter this.

Results

Results by county

See also
 United States presidential elections in Oregon

References

 

1916
Oregon
1916 Oregon elections